Featley is a surname. Notable people with the surname include:

Daniel Featley (1582–1645), English theologian and controversialist
John Featley (1605–1666), English chorister and divine

See also
Flatley